Launch commit criteria are the criteria which must be met in order for the countdown and launch of a Space Shuttle or other launch vehicle to continue.  These criteria relate to safety issues and the general success of the launch, as opposed to supplemental data.

Atlas V

Launch commit criteria for Atlas V launches are similar to those used for the Atlas V launch of the Mars Science Laboratory
 wind at the launch pad exceeds 
 upper-level conditions containing wind shear that could lead to control problems for the  launch vehicle. 
 cumulus clouds with tops that extend into freezing temperatures within 
  of the  edge of a thunderstorm that is producing lightning for 30 minutes after the last lightning is observed. 
 field mill instrument readings within  of the launch pad or the flight  path exceed +/- 1,500  volts per meter for 15 minutes after they occur
  thunderstorm anvil is within  of  the flight path
 thunderstorm debris cloud  is within  or fly through a debris cloud for three hours 
 Do not launch through disturbed weather that has clouds that extend into freezing temperatures and contain moderate or greater precipitation, or launch within  of disturbed weather adjacent to the flight path 
 Do not launch through cumulus clouds formed as the result of or directly attached to a smoke plume

Falcon 9

NASA has identified the Falcon 9 vehicle cannot be launched under the following conditions.
 upper-level conditions containing wind shear that could lead to control problems for the launch vehicle,
 launch within  of cumulus clouds with tops that extend into freezing temperatures,
 within  of the edge of a thunderstorm that is producing lightning within 30 minutes after the last  lightning is observed,
 within  of an attached thunderstorm anvil cloud,
 within  of disturbed weather clouds that extend into freezing temperatures and contain moderate or greater precipitation,
 within  of a thunderstorm debris cloud, 
 through cumulus clouds formed as the result of or directly attached to a smoke plume.

The following should delay launch:
 delay launch for 15 minutes if field mill instrument readings within  of the  launch pad exceed +/-  1,500 volts per meter, or  +/- 1,000 volts per meter,
 delay launch for 30 minutes after lightning is observed within  of the launch pad or the flight path.
Unique for Crew Dragon launches of the Falcon 9:

 weather downrange has a high chance or is violating splashdown limits (wind, wave, lightning, and precipitation limits) in case of a launch escape

Space Shuttle

Weather

The weather conditions NASA required during countdown and launch were specified for "prior to loading external tank propellant" and "after loading propellant has begun".  Weather forecasts were provided by the 45th Weather Squadron at nearby Patrick Air Force Base with concerns such as thunderstorms, winds, low cloud ceilings, or anvil clouds noted in the report.

Prior to loading propellant

Tanking was not to begin if the 24-hour average temperature had been below , the wind was observed or forecast to exceed  for the next three-hour period, or there was a forecast to be greater than a 20% chance of lightning within five nautical miles of the launch pad during the first hour of tanking.

After propellant loading was underway 

After tanking began, the countdown must not be continued, nor the Shuttle launched, if any of the following weather criteria were exceeded:

Temperature
Once propellant loading had begun, the countdown was to be stopped if the temperature remained above  for more than 30 consecutive minutes. In no case was the space shuttle to be launched if the temperature was  degrees or colder.

Wind
For launch the wind constraints at the launch pad varied slightly for each mission.

Precipitation
None was allowed to exist at the launch pad or within the flight path.

References

External links
 Launch Weather Forecast for Cape Canaveral from Patrick Space Force Base
 Example pre-launch weather report from MAVEN pre-launch press conference

Spaceflight